Okanlawon is a surname. Notable people with this surname include:
 Deyemi Okanlawon, Nigerian actor
 Tony Okanlawon (born 1979), American football player
 YungManny (Emmanuel Okanlawon, born 2003), American rapper